"El Último Adiós" (English: "The Last Goodbye") is a song written by Peruvian singer Gian Marco and Cuban American musician and producer Emílio Estefan to commemorate the September 11 attacks and support the families of the victims.  Proceeds of the recording went to the American Red Cross and the United Way. This version of the song was released both as a stand-alone single, and as part of a four-song special EP by the same name. Gian Marco also recorded a solo version of the song, which was considered one of his standout pieces during his international debut.

In the four minutes of the song, a variety of musical genres can be heard, and over 120 different artists were involved in the project, including Ricky Martin, Christina Aguilera, Jennifer Lopez, Shakira, Paulina Rubio, Thalía, Chayanne, Alejandro Sanz, José José, Ivete Sangalo, Luis Fonsi, Ana Bárbara, Juan Luis Guerra and Gloria Estefan.

Personnel
Composers/producers
Gian Marco
Emilio Estefan

Soloists (in order of appearance)

Ricky Martin 
Alejandro Sanz 
Thalía
Juan Luis Guerra & Gloria Estefan
Celia Cruz
Juan Luis Guerra, Gloria Estefan & Olga Tañón
Ricardo Montaner
Ana Gabriel
Jorge Hernández/Los Tigres del Norte & Alicia Villarreal / Grupo Límite
Alejandro Fernández
Carlos Vives
Jaci Velasquez
José Luis Rodríguez "El Puma"
Marco Antonio Solís
José José & Lucía Méndez
Jennifer Lopez
Emmanuel
Chayanne
Elvis Crespo, Gisselle Ortíz Cáceres & Gilberto Santa Rosa
Paulina Rubio
Beto Cuevas / La Ley
Ana Bárbara
Carlos Ponce
Jon Secada
Shakira
Gian Marco
Luis Fonsi
Yuri & Miguel Bosé
Wilkins, Gisselle Ortíz Cáceres Melina León & Ramiro / Limi-T 21
Todos Unidos, Christina Aguilera Ad Libs
José Feliciano & Alejandro Sanz
José Feliciano

Chorus
Conducted by Timothy Sharp

A.B. Quintanilla
Alberto "Beto" Zapata
Álvaro Torres
Charlie Zaa
Ednita Nazario
Elvis Crespo
Emilio Regueira
Franco De Vita
Ivete Sangalo
Kumbia Kings
Luis Conte
Luis Enrique
MDO

Marcos Llunas
Mauricio Claveria
Nestor Torres
Nicolas Tovar
OV7
Patricia Manterola
Pilar Montenegro
Rey Ruiz
Ricky Muñoz
Shalim
Soraya
Tito Puente
Tommy Torres

Instrumentalists
Arranged and Conducted by José Antonio Molina

 Concertmaster – Alfredo Oliva
 Violin – Bogumila Zgraja, Bruce Wethey, Carole Cole, Carole Simmons, Dale Sandvold, Denise Stillwell, Gennady Aronin, Gustavo Correa*, Huifang Chen, John DiPuccio, Mariana Carreras, Mei Mei Luo, Rafael Elvira, Rochelle Skolnick, Sania Derevianko, Scott Flavin, Tony Huang
 Viola – David Chappell, Debra Spring, Karen Hebermehl, Richard Fleischman, Scott O'Donell, Tim Barnes, Xi Yang
 Cello – Chris Glansdorp, Claudio Jaffe, David Cole, Philip Lakofsky, Ross T. Harbaugh
 Double Bass – Geoffrey Bowater
 Harp – Deborah Fleisher
 Guitar – Dan Warner
 Bass Guitar – Julio Hernandez
 Trumpet – Arturo Sandoval, Jason Carder, Teddy Mulet
 Trombone – Dana Teboe, John Kricker
 French Horn – Dwayne Dixon, Jeffrey Meyer, John David Smith
 Flute – Jeanne Tarrant, Nestor Torres
 Clarinet – David Pharris
 Oboe – Robert Weiner
 Bassoon – Luciano Magnanini, Michael Degregorio
 Piano – Michael Levine
 Keyboards – Doug Emery
 Timpani – Mark Schubert
 Percussion – Andy Garcia, Archie Peña

Production Team

 Production Coordinators – Frank Amadeo, Mauricio Abaroa, Jorge A. Plasencia
 Talent Coordinators - Maria Luisa Calderon, Maria Elena Fermin, Mauricio Montenegro
 Studio Coordinator – Kevin Dillon
 Production Directors - Carlos Pulido, César Pulido
 Copyist – Eugenio Vanderhorst
 Engineers – Alfred Figueroa, Andre Rafael, Boris Milan, Eric Schilling, Franco Jordanni, Gustavo Celis, Hector I. Rosa, Isaias García Asbun, Javier Garza, Jim Monti, Joe Leal Sr., Marcelo Sabóia, Robb Williams, Roberto Ruiz 
 Assistant Engineers - Jorge Gonzalez, José Rey, Juan Rosario, Javier Valverde, Charlie Vela, Ed Williams
 Mixer – Freddy Piñero, Jr

Track listing 
 Single
 El Ultimo Adiós (Varios Artistas Version) 3:58

EP
 El Ultimo Adiós (Varios Artistas Version) 3:58
 The Last Goodbye (Jon Secada English Language Version) 3:58
 El Ultimo Adiós (Arturo Sandoval Instrumental Version) 3:58
 El Ultimo Adiós (Gian Marco Version) 3:58

Charts
The song failed to enter the charts, but the EP peaked at No. 197 on the Billboard 200.

Live performances 
The song mainly circulated as a single to be purchased, but a few notable performances and presentations of the song include:

 The national radio simulcast of the White House's Hispanic Heritage Month Event hosted by President George W. Bush on October 14, 2001
 The video of the song was aired on Univision's variety show Sábado Gigante.  The show's host, Don Francisco, came up with the idea to assemble an all-star group to record a tribute album on September 13, and was instrumental in supporting the project.
 Gian Marco recorded a solo acoustic version of the song which he has also performed in his concerts, prefacing the performance with "This song...was born with a guitar. And with that guitar, I will play it to you." He also stated that Don Francisco originally asked him for the song so he could include it in a program he was going to do for the September 11 attack but other artists such as Juan Luis Guerra came into the picture and the song became a collaboration between many artists.

References

thalia-sodi.latin.cz/lyrics

2001 songs
2001 singles
Alejandro Fernández songs
Alejandro Sanz songs
Epic Records singles
Charity singles
Charity singles following the September 11 attacks
Christina Aguilera songs
Gian Marco songs
Music about the September 11 attacks
Paulina Rubio songs
Ricky Martin songs
Shakira songs
Song recordings produced by Emilio Estefan
Songs written by Emilio Estefan
Songs written by Gian Marco
Sony Music Latin singles
All-star recordings
Luis Miguel songs
Gilberto Santa Rosa songs